Sundar Geetha Rajashekar is a Carnatic singer from Chennai, Tamil Nadu, India. She is an All India Radio (AIR) and Doordarshan artiste. She is on the panel of artistes selected by the Indian Council for Cultural Relations (ICCR), New Delhi.

Career 
Geetha Rajashekar started learning Carnatic music at an early age in New Delhi and completed her studies under Sangeetha Kalanidhi Smt and D.K. Pattammal.

She has travelled extensively within India and abroad for concerts, and has been on tour to the USA, Canada, Malaysia, Australia, Singapore, Dubai, Abu Dhabi and London. Several of her performances have been recorded. 

She is the "Founder Trustee" of the Ragalaya Trust, dedicated to the cause of Carnatic Music. She teaches Carnatic music at her own school, Madhura Geetham, in Chennai, with a branch in Toronto Canada where she goes on teaching assignments every year during the summer. She is also a Visiting Guest Professor at Annamalai University Canada Campus.

Awards and honors 
She has been awarded the titles of "Isai Maamani", "Naadha Bhushani", "Bala Rathna" and "Isai Selvam", the latter conferred by the Chief Minister of Tamil Nadu.

She has won prizes from the Music Academy, Shri Krishna Gana Sabha, and The Indian Fine Arts Society during their Annual Music Festivals.

Personal life 
Geetha Rajashekar is married to SS Rajashekar, son of former union minister Chidambaram Subramaniam, and currently resides in Chennai, Tamil Nadu, India.

References

Living people
Women Carnatic singers
Carnatic singers
All India Radio people
Singers from Chennai
20th-century Indian singers
Year of birth missing (living people)
Doordarshan
Indian voice actresses
Indian women classical singers
20th-century Indian actresses
Actresses from Chennai
All India Radio women
Women musicians from Tamil Nadu
20th-century Indian women singers